Claire Adam is a Trinidadian author whose first novel Golden Child triggered critical acclaim. 

On 5 November 2019, the BBC News listed Golden Child on its list of the 100 most influential novels.

Biography
Claire Adam was born in Port of Spain, Trinidad, the youngest of four children of her Trinidadian father and Irish mother.

Leaving Trinidad at the age of 18, Adam went to the US where she studied Physics at Brown University. She then lived for some years in Italy and Ireland, before settling in London. She earned an MA degree in Creative Writing at Goldsmiths, University of London, where she began work on her first novel, Golden Child, which was awarded the 2019 Desmond Elliott Prize for best debut novel. Golden Child also won the McKitterick Prize 2020, the Barnes & Noble 2019 Discover New Writers Prize, and was longlisted for the Jhalak Prize and the Edinburgh Festival First Book Award.

References

21st-century Trinidad and Tobago people
Living people
Trinidad and Tobago women novelists
Year of birth missing (living people)
Recipients of Desmond Elliott Prize